Erythrokeratodermia with ataxia  is a condition characterized by erythematous, hyperkeratotic plaques with fine, white, attached scales distributed almost symmetrically on the extremities.

See also 
 Hallerman–Streiff syndrome
 List of cutaneous conditions

References

External links 

Genodermatoses